Odaesan National Park is located in the province of Gangwon-do, South Korea. It was first designated as the 11th national park in 1975. The park is named after the  mountain Odaesan, which means "Five Plains Mountain", named after the five plains between the area's five major peaks. The park is home to a total of 3,788 species: 1,040 plant species, 28 mammal species, 103 bird species, 13 amphibian species, 12 reptile species, 35 fish species, 1,976 insect species and 157 spider species.

The park has some tourist amenities such as campgrounds, walking paths, and pension-style accommodations.

References

External links

The park's page on Korea National Park Service's website

National parks of South Korea
Protected areas established in 1975
Parks in Gangwon Province, South Korea